Estádio Governador Alberto Tavares Silva, also known as Albertão is a multi-purpose stadium in Teresina, Brazil. It is currently used mostly for football matches and it is the home stadium of River Atlético Clube and Esporte Clube Flamengo. The stadium holds 44,200. The stadium is owned by the government of Piauí state and is named after Alberto Tavares Silva, who was Piauí governor between 1971 and 1975.

History

It was built in 1973, and inaugurated on August 26 of that year. Eight people died during mass panic when the stadium's inauguration, which broke out when a spectator shouted that the stadium was collapsing. In reality the vibrations felt were reportedly caused by a low-flying aircraft. Although the death toll in different official reports varies, it is generally accepted that this remains the worst disaster in the history of Brazilian football.

The inaugural match was played on August 26, 1973, when Tiradentes and Fluminense drew 0-0.

The first goal of the stadium was scored on August 29, 1973, by Cruzeiro's Dirceu Lopes, when Tiradentes and Cruzeiro drew 1-1.

The stadium's attendance record currently stands at 60,271, set on March 13, 1983, when Flamengo beat Tiradentes 3–1.

References
Enciclopédia do Futebol Brasileiro, Volume 2 - Lance, Rio de Janeiro: Aretê Editorial S/A, 2001.

Specific

External links
Templos do Futebol

Albertão
Multi-purpose stadiums in Brazil
Sports venues in Piauí